Emmanuel Bwacha CON is a Nigerian politician who was elected to the Senate for the Taraba South Senatorial District of Taraba State, Nigeria, in the 2011 general elections. He was elected on the platform of the Peoples Democratic Party (PDP). He was reelected under the same party in the 2015 general elections. Bwacha was again declared the winner of 2019 general elections for Taraba South Senatorial District, Taraba State, Nigeria.

Early life, education, and career
Bwacha was born in the Donga Local Government Area of Taraba State.
He has an Education Diploma in Public Administration from the University of Calabar. 
A public servant, he served as Commissioner of Agriculture for Taraba State between 1999 and 2003 in the Jolly Nyame administration.
Bwacha was elected to the Federal House of Representatives for the Donga / Ussa / Takum Constituency, serving from May 2003 to May 2007.
He was Chairman of the House Committee on Police Affairs.
In the April 2007 elections he lost his bid for the Senate seat.

Nigerian Senate
The favorite of governor Danbaba Suntai, Bwacha won the PDP primaries for the Taraba South senate seat in January 2011 without opposition from the incumbent Senator Joel Danlami Ikenya, who was running for election as governor.
On 9 April 2011 elections Bwacha received 106,172 votes, ahead of Aliyu of the Action Congress of Nigeria (ACN) with 80,256 votes. Senator Bwacha is the Governorship candidate of the APC in Taraba State.

References

Living people
People from Taraba State
Taraba State Peoples Democratic Party politicians
Peoples Democratic Party members of the Senate (Nigeria)
1962 births